The 1995 Dutch TT was the seventh round of the 1995 Grand Prix motorcycle racing season. It took place on 24 June 1995 at the TT Circuit Assen located in Assen, Netherlands.

500 cc classification

250 cc classification

125 cc classification

References

Dutch TT
Dutch
Tourist Trophy
Dutch TT